Jasper County is a county located in the U.S. state of Texas. As of the 2020 census, its population was 32,980. Its county seat is Jasper. The county was created as a municipality in Mexico in 1834, and in 1837 was organized as a county in the Republic of Texas. It is named for William Jasper, an American Revolutionary War hero.

Geography

Major highways
  U.S. Highway 69
  U.S. Highway 96
  U.S. Highway 190
  State Highway 62
  State Highway 63
  Recreational Road 255

Adjacent counties
 San Augustine County (north)
 Sabine County (northeast)
 Newton County (east)
 Orange County (south)
 Hardin County (southwest)
 Tyler County (west)
 Angelina County (northwest)

National protected areas
 Angelina National Forest (part)
 Big Thicket National Preserve (part)
 Sabine National Forest (part)

Demographics

Note: the US Census treats Hispanic/Latino as an ethnic category. This table excludes Latinos from the racial categories and assigns them to a separate category. Hispanics/Latinos can be of any race.

As of the census of 2000,  35,604 people, 13,450 households, and 9,966 families resided in the county.  The population density was 38 people per square mile (15/km2).  The 16,576 housing units averaged 18 per square mile (7/km2).  The racial makeup of the county was 78.24% White, 17.81% Black or African American, 0.42% Native American, 0.32% Asian, 0.03% Pacific Islander, 2.04% from other races, and 1.15% from two or more races. About  3.89% of the population was Hispanic or Latino of any race.

Of the 13,450 households, 33.40% had children under the age of 18 living with them, 58.20% were married couples living together, 12.50% had a female householder with no husband present, and 25.90% were not families. About 23% of all households were made up of individuals, and 11.2% had someone living alone who was 65 years of age or older.  The average household size was 2.58 and the average family size was 3.03.

In the county, the population was distributed as 26.50% under the age of 18, 8.00% from 18 to 24, 26.80% from 25 to 44, 23.40% from 45 to 64, and 15.30% who were 65 years of age or older.  The median age was 37 years. For every 100 females, there were 94.60 males.  For every 100 females age 18 and over, there were 92.10 males.

The median income for a household in the county was $30,902, and for a family was $35,709. Males had a median income of $31,739 versus $19,119 for females. The per capita income for the county was $15,636.  About 15.00% of families and 18.10% of the population were below the poverty line, including 23.40% of those under age 18 and 17.80% of those age 65 or over.

Government

United States Congress

County officials
 County Judge - Judge Mark W. Allen
 Commissioner, Pct. #1 - Seth Martindale
 Commissioner, Pct. #2 - Roy Parker
 Commissioner, Pct. #3 - Willie Stark
 Commissioner, Pct. #4 - Vance Moss
 County Sheriff - Mitchel Newman
 Tax Assessor/Collector - Bobby Biscamp
 County Clerk - Debbie Newman
 County Treasurer - René Ellis
 County Auditor - Mellissa Smith
 Tax Appraiser - Lori Barnett
 Emergency Management Coordinator - Billy Ted Smith

The County jail is named after former Sheriff, Aubrey E. Cole.

District officials
 District Judge - Judicial District 1 - Judge Craig M. Mixson (appointed by Texas Governor Rick Perry to complete term of Judge Gary Gatlin, who resigned effective December 31, 2011)
 District Judge - Judicial District 1A - DeLinda Gibbs-Walker
 District Clerk - Rosa Norsworthy
 District Attorney - Anne Pickle

Courts
 Justice of the Peace, Pct. #1 - John Cooper
 Justice of the Peace, Pct. #2 - Raymond Hopson
 Justice of the Peace, Pct. #3 - Mike Smith
 Justice of the Peace, Pct. #4 - Gina Cleveland
 Justice of the Peace, Pct. #5 - Brett Holloway
 Justice of the Peace, Pct. #6 - Steve Conner
 Constable, Pct. #1 - Jimmy Hensarling
 Constable, Pct. #2 - Niles Nichols
 Constable, Pct. #3 - Ronnie Hutchison
 Constable, Pct. #4 - Gene Hawthorne
 Constable, Pct. #5 - Michael Poindexter
 Constable, Pct. #6 - Joe Sterling

Communities

Cities
 Browndell
 Jasper (county seat)
 Kirbyville

Census-designated places
 Buna
 Evadale
 Sam Rayburn

Unincorporated communities
 Beans
 Beech Grove
 Bessmay
 Brookeland (partly in Sabine County)
 Erin
 Gist

Ghost towns
 Zeirath

Education
School districts:
 Brookeland Independent School District
 Buna Independent School District
 Colmesneil Independent School District
 Evadale Independent School District
 Jasper Independent School District
 Kirbyville Consolidated Independent School District
 Vidor Independent School District

Areas of Jasper County in Brookeland ISD, Colmesneil ISD, and Jasper ISD are assigned to Angelina College. Legislation does not specify a community college for the remainder of the county.

See also

 National Register of Historic Places listings in Jasper County, Texas
 Recorded Texas Historic Landmarks in Jasper County

References

External links
  Jasper-Newton-Sabine Counties - Office of Emergency Management & Homeland Security 
 Jasper County Government Website
 Jasper Newton County Public Health District  Public Health Website for Jasper County
 The Deep East Texas Council of Governments (DETCOG)
 
 Jasper County, TXGenWeb Focuses on genealogical research in Jasper County.

 
1837 establishments in the Republic of Texas
Populated places established in 1837